The head bobble, head wobble, or Indian head shake refers to a common gesture found in South Asian cultures, most notably in India. The motion usually consists of a side-to-side tilting of the head in arcs along the coronal plane. A form of nonverbal communication, it may mean yes, good, maybe, ok, or I understand, depending on the context.

Usage 
In India, a head bobble can have a variety of different meanings. Most frequently it means yes, or is used to indicate understanding. The meaning of the head bobble depends on the context of the conversation or encounter. It can serve as an alternative to thank you, as a polite introduction, or it can represent acknowledgement.

Head bobbles can also be used in an intentionally vague manner. An unenthusiastic head bobble can be a polite way of declining something without saying no directly.

The gesture is common throughout India. However, it is used more frequently in South India.

See also
 Head shake
 Nod

References

External links 
 The myths that mystify - TED talk (ends with a reference to "the Indian head shake") 
 Do you wobble?

Human communication
Head gestures
South Asia